The 2022 Lamar Cardinals baseball team represented Lamar University during the 2022 NCAA Division I baseball season. The Cardinals played their home games at Vincent–Beck Stadium and were led by sixth–year head coach Will Davis. They were members of the Western Athletic Conference. This was Lamar's first year in the WAC.  The Cardinals had a regular season record of 37–21 and a conference record of 20–10 finishing in second place in the WAC Southwest division, one game behind division winner Sam Houston.  They participated in the 2022 Western Athletic Conference baseball tournament as the second seeded team from the Southwest Division.  After winning their first conference tournament game against Seattle, the Cardinals' season ended after losing to West Division first seed Grand Canyon and Southwest Division fourth seed Abilene Christian.

Preseason

Western Athletic Conference Coaches Poll
The Western Athletic Conference Coaches Poll was released on February 9, 2022, and the Cardinals were picked to finish fourth in the Southwest Division with 11 votes.

Preseason All-WAC Team & Honors

2022 Preseason All-WAC Team

C - Kaden Hollow, So., Dixie State
1B - Elijah Buries, So., Grand Canyon
1B - Chase Kemp, Sr., Lamar
2B - Kevin Jiminez, Jr., NM State
3B - Juan Colato, R-Sr., Grand Canyon
SS - Jacob Wilson, So., Grand Canyon
OF - Tayler Aguilar, Jr., Grand Canyon
OF - Colton Eager, Gr., Abilene Christian
OF - Grayson Tatrow, Jr., Abilene Christian
DH/UT - Tommy Cruz, Sr., Abilene Christian
SP - Coltin Atkinson, So., Sam Houston
SP - Kevin Stevens, R-Sr., UT Rio Grande Valley
SP - Carter Young, So., Grand Canyon
RP - CJ Culpepper, So., California Baptist

Roster

Coaching staff

Schedule and results

Postseason All-WAC Team & Honors

2022 Postseason All-WAC Teams
2022 First Team All-WAC
Catcher: David Martin, So., California Baptist
First Base: Logan Gallina, So., NM State
Second Base: Harrison Spohn, Sr., California Baptist
Third Base: Juan Colato, R-Sr., Grand Canyon
Shortstop: Jacob Wilson, So., Grand Canyon
Outfield: Tayler Aguilar, Jr., Grand Canyon
Outfield: Chad Castillo, Jr., California Baptist
Outfield: Carlos Contreras, Jr., Sam Houston
DH/Utility: Parker Schmidt, So., Dixie State
At-Large: Tyler Wilson, So., C, Grand Canyon
Starting Pitcher: Daniel Avitia, Fr., Grand Canyon
Starting Pitcher: Kevin Stevens, R-Sr, UT Rio Grande Valley
Relief Pitcher: Jack Dallas, Sr., Lamar
At-Large: Vince Reilly, Jr., RHP, Grand Canyon

2022 Second Team All-WAC
Catcher: Kaden Hollow, So., Dixie State
First Base: Justin Wishkoski, So., Sam Houston
Second Base: Kemuel Thomas-Rivera, Gr., Tarleton
Third Base: Mitchel Simon, So., California Baptist
Shortstop: Bash Randle, So., Abilene Christian
Outfield: Brett Cain, Gr., UT Rio Grande Valley
Outfield: Matthew McDonald, Sr., Lamar
Outfield: Brandon Pimentel, Jr., UT Rio Grande Valley
DH/Utility: Russell Stevenson, Sr., California Baptist
At-Large: London Green, Sr., OF, Tarleton
Starting Pitcher: CJ Culpepper, So., California Baptist
Starting Pitcher: Adam Wheaton, Sr., Lamar
Relief Pitcher: Lance Lusk, Sr., Sam Houston
At-Large: Nick Hull, Gr., RHP, Grand Canyon

2022 All-Defensive Team
Kirkland Banks, Jr., IF, Lamar
Logan Gallina, So., 1B, NM State
London Green, Sr., OF, Tarleton
Walker Janek, Fr., UT, Sam Houston
Chase Kemp, Sr., IF, Lamar
Isaac Lopez, R-Fr., IF, UT Rio Grande Valley
Bash Randle, So., SS, Abilene Christian
Harrison Spohn, Sr., IF, California Baptist
Jacob Wilson, So., SS, Grand Canyon
Cade Verdusco, So., OF, Grand Canyon

References

Lamar Cardinals
Lamar Cardinals baseball seasons
Lamar Cardinals baseball